Brubacher House (also known as the John E. Brubacher House) is a historic house museum in Waterloo, Ontario, Canada which showcases the home life of 19th century Mennonite pioneers in Waterloo County. The house was built in 1850 or 1851 by the Mennonite community for the Brubacher family. It and its attached farmland were sold in 1965 to the University of Waterloo.

History

The Brubacher (or Brubaker) family originated in Switzerland, but had lived in Brubaker Valley, Lancaster County, Pennsylvania since the early 18th century as a part of the Mennonite community in Pennsylvania. Their relocation to Waterloo County began when Mary Brubacher (1789–1834) married Benjamin Eby in 1807. In the same year, she traveled with him to settle on land near the Grand River which would become known as Ebytown, and later be known as Berlin and Kitchener. The rest of her family gradually followed, and her mother, Susanna, bought land in the area. One of Susanna's sons, John E. Brubacher, became a Mennonite deacon and successful pioneer, who acquired significant landholdings (some of it purchased from his mother) and then distributed it to his fifteen children. Among them was another John E. Brubacher, who would be the first Brubacher to live in the house. John married his first wife, Magdalena Musselman, in 1846. Soon, with his father's help, he was able to obtain a parcel of land in the northwest of the historic Waterloo Township, which today is part of the City of Waterloo. This would be the location of his family farm, and where he would make his home.

Construction on the house began in 1850. It was built using fieldstone in the typical Georgian style favoured by Mennonites at the time, and consisted of a -storey farmhouse built into a hillside, allowing for level access to the basement on the south side. John and Magdalena Brubacher ultimately had 14 children, many of whom moved to other districts. Their fourth son, Benjamin M. Brubacher, purchased part of his father's farm and erected buildings of his own there. The Brubacher family continued to live in the house and operate the farm until the early 20th century, when operations shifted to other farmers.

In the late 1950s through the 1960s, the University of Waterloo began to form and academic buildings were constructed on the land around the former Schweitzer farmhouse to the south of the Brubacher lands. In 1965, the university purchased the Brubacher lands, including the house, and demolished many of the existing buildings. Due to the rapid development of Waterloo in the early- to mid-20th century, the natural wetlands and drainage areas around Laurel Creek were drained, eliminating natural reservoirs during high water periods such as spring floods. As a result, flooding of the creek became more severe, and a number of reservoirs were constructed for flood control upstream (north) of Waterloo's urban core. One of these, Columbia Lake, was created on the western portion of the Brubacher land, submerging the old farmland. The Mennonite Historical Society of Ontario and the University of Waterloo Faculty of Environment campaigned for at least one of the old Mennonite farmhouses on the campus to be preserved and restored, and in 1967 the Brubacher farmhouse was chosen. In the following year, 1968, the vacant farmhouse burned down, resulting in the total destruction of its roof and wooden structural components. Through the efforts of the local Mennonite community and its craftsmen, the house was painstakingly reconstructed and re-furnished using authentic 19th century artifacts donated by local Mennonite families, including the Brubacher family.

The rebuilt house was given heritage designation in 1975 by the City of Waterloo under the Ontario Heritage Act, and tours began in the 1980s.

Museum information
The house is open seasonally for tours. It has a small adjacent parking lot and sits next to the Trans-Canada Trail. It is also within walking distance of the University of Waterloo and Research and Technology ION light rail stations, as well as the 9, 13, and 31 Grand River Transit local bus routes.

See also

 Schneider Haus
 Doon Heritage Village
 List of oldest buildings and structures in Kitchener-Waterloo area

References

External links

 

Houses in Waterloo, Ontario
Museums in Waterloo, Ontario
University of Waterloo buildings
Historic house museums in Ontario
Mennonite museums
History of Waterloo, Ontario
Georgian architecture in Canada
History of agriculture in Ontario